An axion is a hypothetical elementary particle postulated by the Peccei–Quinn theory in 1977 to resolve the strong CP problem in quantum chromodynamics (QCD). If axions exist and have low mass within a specific range, they are of interest as a possible component of cold dark matter.

History

Strong CP problem
As shown by Gerard 't Hooft, strong interactions of the standard model, QCD, possess a non-trivial vacuum structure that in principle permits violation of the combined symmetries of charge conjugation and parity, collectively known as CP. Together with effects generated by weak interactions, the effective periodic strong CP-violating term, appears as a Standard Model input – its value is not predicted by the theory, but must be measured. However, large CP-violating interactions originating from QCD would induce a large electric dipole moment (EDM) for the neutron. Experimental constraints on the currently unobserved EDM implies CP violation from QCD must be extremely tiny and thus  must itself be extremely small. Since  could have any value between 0 and 2, this presents a "naturalness" problem for the standard model. Why should this parameter find itself so close to zero? (Or, why should QCD find itself CP-preserving?) This question constitutes what is known as the strong CP problem.

Prediction
In 1977, Roberto Peccei and Helen Quinn postulated a more elegant solution to the strong CP problem, the Peccei–Quinn mechanism. The idea is to effectively promote  to a field. This is accomplished by adding a new global symmetry (called a Peccei–Quinn (PQ) symmetry) that becomes spontaneously broken. Wilczek named this new hypothesized particle the "axion" after a brand of laundry detergent because it "cleaned up" a problem, while Weinberg called it "the higglet." Weinberg later agreed to adopt Wilczek's name for the particle. Because it has a non-zero mass, the axion is a pseudo-Nambu–Goldstone boson.

Axion dark matter
QCD effects produce an effective periodic potential in which the axion field moves. The oscillations of the axion field about the minimum of the effective potential, the so-called misalignment mechanism, generate a cosmological population of cold axions with an abundance depending on the mass of the axion. With a mass above  times the electron mass (5 µeV/²) axions could account for dark matter, and thus be both a dark-matter candidate and a solution to the strong CP problem. If inflation occurs at a low scale and lasts sufficiently long, the axion mass can be as low as 1 peV/².

There are two distinct scenarios in which the axion field begins its evolution, depending on the following two conditions:

Broadly speaking, one of the two possible scenarios outlined in the two following subsections occurs:

Pre-inflationary scenario 
If both (a) and (b) are satisfied, cosmic inflation selects one patch of the Universe within which the spontaneous breaking of the PQ symmetry leads to a homogeneous value of the initial value of the axion field. In this "pre-inflationary" scenario, topological defects are inflated away and do not contribute to the axion energy density. However, other bounds that come from isocurvature modes severely constrain this scenario, which require a relatively low-energy scale of inflation to be viable.

Post-inflationary scenario 
If at least one of the conditions (a) or (b) is violated, the axion field takes different values within patches that are initially out of causal contact, but that today populate the volume enclosed by our Hubble horizon. In this scenario, isocurvature fluctuations in the PQ field randomise the axion field, with no preferred value in the power spectrum.

The proper treatment in this scenario is to solve numerically the equation of motion of the PQ field in an expanding Universe, in order to capture all features coming from the misalignment mechanism, including the contribution from topological defects like "axionic" strings and domain walls. An axion mass estimate between 0.05–1.50 meV was reported by Borsanyi et al. (2016). The result was calculated by simulating the formation of axions during the post-inflation period on a supercomputer.

Recent progresses in determining the present abundance of a  axion using numerical simulations lead to values between 0.02 and 0.1 meV, although these results have been challenged by the details on the power spectrum of emitted axions from strings.

Phenomenology of the axion field

Searches 
Axion models carefully choose coupling strengths that are too weak to have been detected in prior experiments. It had been thought that these "invisible axions" solved the strong CP problem while still being too small to have been observed before.

The very weakly coupled axion is also very light, because axion couplings and mass are proportional. Satisfaction with "invisible axions" changed when it was shown that any very light axion would have been overproduced in the early universe and therefore must be excluded.

Maxwell's equations with axion modifications
Pierre Sikivie published a modification of Maxwell's equations that arise from a light, stable axion in 1983. He showed that these axions could be detected on Earth by converting them to photons, using a strong magnetic field, hence leading to several experiments: The ADMX; Solar axions may be converted to X-rays, as in CERN Axion Solar Telescope (CAST); other experiments are searching laser light for signs of axions.

There is a symmetry in Maxwell's equations where the electric and magnetic fields can be rotated into each other with the new fields still satisfying Maxwell's equations. Luca Visinelli showed that the duality symmetry can be carried over to the axion-augmented electromagnetic theory as well. Assuming the existence of both magnetic monopoles and axions, the complete set of Maxwell equations reads:

{| class="wikitable" style="text-align: center;"
|-
! scope="col" style="width: 15em;" | Name
! scope="col" |  Equations
|-
! scope="row" | Gauss's law
| 
|-
! scope="row" | Gauss's law for magnetism
| 
|-
! scope="row" | Faraday's law
| 
|-
! scope="row" | Ampère–Maxwell law
| 
|-
! scope="row" | Axion law
| 
|}

If magnetic monopoles do not exist, then the same equations hold, with the monopole density  and monopole current  replaced by zero. With or without monopoles, incorporating the axion into Maxwell's equations has the effect of rotating the electric and magnetic fields into each other.

where the mixing angle  depends on the coupling constant  and the axion field strength 

By plugging the new values for electromagnetic field  and  into Maxwell's equations we obtain the axion-modified Maxwell equations above. Incorporating the axion into the electromagnetic theory also gives a new differential equation – the axion law – which is simply the Klein–Gordon equation (the quantum field theory equation for massive spin-zero particles) with an  source term.

Analogous effect for topological insulators
A term analogous to the one that would be added to Maxwell's equations to account for axions also appears in recent (2008) theoretical models for topological insulators giving an effective axion description of the electrodynamics of these materials.

This term leads to several interesting predicted properties including a quantized magnetoelectric effect. Evidence for this effect has recently been given in THz spectroscopy experiments performed at the Johns Hopkins University on quantum regime thin film topological insulators developed at Rutgers University.

In 2019, a team at the Max Planck Institute for Chemical Physics of Solids published their detection of axion insulators within a Weyl semimetal. An axion insulator is a quasiparticle – an excitation of electrons that behave together as an axion – and its discovery is consistent with the existence of the axion as an elementary particle.

Experiments 
Despite not yet having been found, axion models have been well studied for over 40 years, giving time for physicists to develop insight into axion effects that might be detected. Several experimental searches for axions are presently underway; most exploit axions' expected slight interaction with photons in strong magnetic fields. Axions are also one of the few remaining plausible candidates for dark matter particles, and might be discovered in some dark matter experiments.

Direct conversion in a magnetic field
Several experiments search for astrophysical axions by the Primakoff effect, which converts axions to photons and vice versa in electromagnetic fields.
 
The Axion Dark Matter Experiment (ADMX) at the University of Washington uses a strong magnetic field to detect the possible weak conversion of axions to microwaves.
ADMX searches the galactic dark matter halo for axions resonant with a cold microwave cavity. ADMX has excluded optimistic axion models in the 1.9–3.53 μeV range. From 2013–2018 a series of upgrades were done and it is taking new data, including at 4.9–6.2 µeV. In December 2021 it excluded the 3.3–4.2 μeV range for the KSVZ model.

Other experiments of this type include DMRadio, HAYSTAC, CULTASK, and ORGAN. HAYSTAC recently completed the first scanning run of a haloscope above 20 µeV.

Polarized light in a magnetic field
The Italian PVLAS experiment searches for polarization changes of light propagating in a magnetic field. The concept was first put forward in 1986 by Luciano Maiani, Roberto Petronzio and Emilio Zavattini. A rotation claim in 2006 was excluded by an upgraded setup. An optimized search began in 2014.

Light shining through walls
Another technique is so called "light shining through walls", where light passes through an intense magnetic field to convert photons into axions, which then pass through metal and are reconstituted as photons by another magnetic field on the other side of the barrier. Experiments by BFRS and a team led by Rizzo ruled out an axion cause. GammeV saw no events, reported in a 2008 Physics Review Letter. ALPS I conducted similar runs, setting new constraints in 2010; ALPS II is currently being built in 2022. OSQAR found no signal, limiting coupling and will continue.

Astrophysical axion searches 
Axion-like bosons could have a signature in astrophysical settings. In particular, several recent works have proposed axion-like particles as a solution to the apparent transparency of the Universe to TeV photons. It has also been demonstrated in a few recent works that, in the large magnetic fields threading the atmospheres of compact astrophysical objects (e.g., magnetars), photons will convert much more efficiently. This would in turn give rise to distinct absorption-like features in the spectra detectable by current telescopes. A new promising means is looking for quasi-particle refraction in systems with strong magnetic gradients. In particular, the refraction will lead to beam splitting in the radio light curves of highly magnetized pulsars and allow much greater sensitivities than currently achievable. The International Axion Observatory (IAXO) is a proposed fourth generation helioscope.

Axions can resonantly convert into photons in the magnetospheres of neutron stars. The emerging photons lie in the GHz frequency range and can be potentially picked up in radio detectors, leading to a sensitive probe of the axion parameter space. This strategy has been used to constrain the axion-photon coupling in the 5–11 μeV mass range, by re-analyzing existing data from the Green Bank Telescope and the Effelsberg 100 m Telescope. A novel, alternative strategy consists in detecting the transient signal from the encounter between a neutron star and an axion minicluster in the Milky Way.

Axions can be produced in the Sun's core when X-rays scatter in strong electric fields. The CAST solar telescope is underway, and has set limits on coupling to photons and electrons. 
Axions may be produced within neutron stars, by nucleon-nucleon bremsstrahlung. The subsequent decay of axions to gamma rays allows constraints on the axion mass to be placed from observations of neutron stars in gamma-rays using the Fermi LAT. From an analysis of four neutron stars, Berenji et al. (2016) obtained a 95% confidence interval upper limit on the axion mass of 0.079 eV. In 2021 it has been also suggested that a reported excess of hard X-ray emission from a system of neutron stars known as the magnificent seven could be explained as axion emission.

In 2016, a theoretical team from Massachusetts Institute of Technology devised a possible way of detecting axions using a strong magnetic field that need be no stronger than that produced in an MRI scanning machine. It would show variation, a slight wavering, that is linked to the mass of the axion. The experiment is now being implemented by experimentalists at the university.

In 2022 the polarized light measurements of Messier 87* by the EHT were used to constrain the mass of the axion assuming that hypothetical clouds of axions could form around a black hole rejecting the ~ eV/c^2 range of mass values.

Searches for resonance effects
Resonance effects may be evident in Josephson junctions from a supposed high flux of axions from the galactic halo with mass of 110 µeV and density  compared to the implied dark matter density , indicating said axions would not have enough mass to be the sole component of dark matter. The ORGAN experiment plans to conduct a direct test of this result via the haloscope method.

Dark matter recoil searches
Dark matter cryogenic detectors have searched for electron recoils that would indicate axions. CDMS published in 2009 and EDELWEISS set coupling and mass limits in 2013. UORE and XMASS also set limits on solar axions in 2013. XENON100 used a 225 day run to set the best coupling limits to date and exclude some parameters.

Nuclear spin precession 
While Schiff's theorem states that a static nuclear electric dipole moment (EDM) does not produce atomic and molecular EDMs, the axion induces an oscillating nuclear EDM which oscillates at the Larmor frequency. If this nuclear EDM oscillation frequency is in resonance with an external electric field, a precession in the nuclear spin rotation occurs. This precession can be measured using precession magnetometry and if detected, would be evidence for Axions.

An experiment using this technique is the Cosmic Axion Spin Precession Experiment (CASPEr).

Searches at Particle Colliders 
Axions can also be produced at colliders, in particular in electron positron collisions as well as in ultra-peripheral heavy ion collisions at the LHC, reinterpreting the light-by-light scattering process. Those searches are sensitive for rather large axion masses between 100 MeV/c^2 and hundreds of GeV/c^2. Assuming a coupling of axions to the Higgs Boson, searches for anomalous Higgs boson decays into two axions can provide even stronger limits.

Possible detections
It was reported in 2014 that evidence for axions may have been detected as a seasonal variation in observed X-ray emission that would be expected from conversion in the Earth's magnetic field of axions streaming from the Sun. Studying 15 years of data by the European Space Agency's XMM-Newton observatory, a research group at Leicester University noticed a seasonal variation for which no conventional explanation could be found. One potential explanation for the variation, described as "plausible" by the senior author of the paper, is the known seasonal variation in visibility to XMM-Newton of the sunward magnetosphere in which X-rays may be produced by axions from the Sun's core.

This interpretation of the seasonal variation is disputed by two Italian researchers, who identify flaws in the arguments of the Leicester group that are said to rule out an interpretation in terms of axions. Most importantly, the scattering in angle assumed by the Leicester group to be caused by magnetic field gradients during the photon production, necessary to allow the X-rays to enter the detector that cannot point directly at the sun, would dissipate the flux so much that the probability of detection would be negligible.

In 2013, Christian Beck suggested that axions might be detectable in Josephson junctions; and in 2014, he argued that a signature, consistent with a mass ≈110 μeV, had in fact been observed in several preexisting experiments.

In 2020, the XENON1T experiment at the Gran Sasso National Laboratory in Italy reported a result suggesting the discovery of solar axions. The results are not yet significant at the 5-sigma level required for confirmation, and other explanations of the data are possible though less likely.  New observations made in July 2022, after the observatory upgrade to XENONnT, discarded the excess.

Properties

Predictions 
One theory of axions relevant to cosmology had predicted that they would have no electric charge, a very small mass in the range from 1 µeV/c² to 1 eV/c², and very low interaction cross-sections for strong and weak forces. Because of their properties, axions would interact only minimally with ordinary matter. Axions would also change to and from photons in magnetic fields.

Cosmological implications 
Inflation suggests that if they exist, axions would be created abundantly during the Big Bang. Because of a unique coupling to the instanton field of the primordial universe (the "misalignment mechanism"), an effective dynamical friction is created during the acquisition of mass, following cosmic inflation. This robs all such primordial axions of their kinetic energy.

A single ULA with a GUT scale decay constant provides the correct relic density without fine-tuning.

Axions would also have stopped interaction with normal matter at a different moment after the Big Bang than other more massive dark particles. The lingering effects of this difference could perhaps be calculated and observed astronomically.

If axions have low mass, thus preventing other decay modes (since there are no lighter particles to decay into), theories predict that the universe would be filled with a very cold Bose–Einstein condensate of primordial axions. Hence, axions could plausibly explain the dark matter problem of physical cosmology. Observational studies are underway, but they are not yet sufficiently sensitive to probe the mass regions if they are the solution to the dark matter problem with the fuzzy dark matter region starting to be probed via superradiance. High mass axions of the kind searched for by Jain and Singh (2007) would not persist in the modern universe. Moreover, if axions exist, scatterings with other particles in the thermal bath of the early universe unavoidably produce a population of hot axions.

Low mass axions could have additional structure at the galactic scale. If they continuously fall into galaxies from the intergalactic medium, they would be denser in "caustic" rings, just as the stream of water in a continuously-flowing fountain is thicker at its peak. The gravitational effects of these rings on galactic structure and rotation might then be observable. Other cold dark matter theoretical candidates, such as WIMPs and MACHOs, could also form such rings, but because such candidates are fermionic and thus experience friction or scattering among themselves, the rings would be less sharply defined.

João G. Rosa and Thomas W. Kephart suggested that axion clouds formed around unstable primordial black holes might initiate a chain of reactions that radiate electromagnetic waves, allowing their detection. When adjusting the mass of the axions to explain dark matter, the pair discovered that the value would also explain the luminosity and wavelength of fast radio bursts, being a possible origin for both phenomena. In 2022 a similar hypothesis was used to constrain the mass of the axion from data of M87*

Supersymmetry 
In supersymmetric theories the axion has both a scalar and a fermionic superpartner. The fermionic superpartner of the axion is called the axino, the scalar superpartner is called the saxion or dilaton.
They are all bundled up in a chiral superfield.

The axino has been predicted to be the lightest supersymmetric particle in such a model.  In part due to this property, it is considered a candidate for dark matter.

See also 

 List of hypothetical particles 
 Weakly Interacting Slender Particle

Footnotes

References

Sources

External links

 
 
 
 
 
 
 
 
 
 
 

Bosons
Dark matter
Astroparticle physics
Hypothetical elementary particles
Subatomic particles with spin 0
Physics beyond the Standard Model
Astrophysics
Quantum chromodynamics